The women's Twenty20 cricket tournament at the 2017 Southeast Asian Games took place at Kinrara Oval in Selangor from 22 to 28 August 2017. The competition was held in a round-robin format followed by 2 play-offs: 1st against 2nd for gold medal and 3rd against 4th for bronze medal.

Competition schedule
The following was the competition schedule for the women's Twenty20 competitions:

Results
All times are Malaysia Standard Time (UTC+08:00)

Round-robin

Updated to matches played on 27 August 2017. Source: ESPNCricInfo

Play-offs

3rd place play-off

Final

References

Women's twenty20 tournament